Scirocco, also known as Amantide – Scirocco and with the international title Sahara Heat, is a 1987 French drama film directed by Aldo Lado and starring Fiona Gélin.

Plot
Léa (Gélin) is married to engineer Alfredo (Enzo De Caro) who works at oil wells in the Maghreb. She visits her husband and finds that their marriage is deteriorating. She seeks relief in the exoticism the country offers and she is soon attracted to a local thug nicknamed Le Serpent (Yves Collignon) she meets in the kasbah. However, her relationship with him starts to become increasingly exploitative.

Cast
Fiona Gélin: Léa
Enzo De Caro: Alfredo
Yves Collignon: Le Serpent
Joshua McDonald: Jeff
Gianluigi Ghione: Stefan
Christophe Ratendra: Le garçon d'étage
Alberto Canova: Kurt
Abdellatif Hamrouni: Vecchio Arabo
Nadia Saiji: Gitana

Production
Fiona Gélin tells of her ordeal during the shooting of this film: "In fact, there were nude scenes that were hidden from me and that I had to play. The result was on the verge of an erotic film. I felt betrayed, completely disoriented and I broke down. I was ashamed of myself. This led to a depression and a month in a psychiatric hospital."

References

External links 

1987 films
French drama films
Italian drama films
1980s French-language films
Adultery in films
1987 drama films
Films shot in Tunisia
Films set in Africa
Films directed by Aldo Lado
1980s French films
1980s Italian films